Le Vieux Presbytere, at 101 South Rogers Street in Church Point in Acadia Parish, Louisiana, was listed on the National Register of Historic Places in 1997.

In 1997 it was located at 205 Rue Iry Lejeune, and had been moved twice from its original location.

It is a one-and-one-half story frame bousillage house, located in 1997 across from the church square in the small community of Church Point.

It was a presbytery.

References

National Register of Historic Places in Acadia Parish, Louisiana
Italianate architecture in Louisiana
Queen Anne architecture in Louisiana
Buildings and structures completed in 1887